Charles Ingram Armitage (28 April 1849 – 24 April 1917)  was an English amateur  cricketer, who played first-class cricket for Yorkshire County Cricket Club. Although he appeared only three times, his career spanned six years, from 1873 to 1878. His father-in-law was William Coates, a career soldier.

Biography
Armitage was born at Birky Grange, Huddersfield, Yorkshire, England.

Although a left arm fast bowler, he failed to take a wicket for Yorkshire - he bowled just one spell of six overs, two maidens, for 29 runs.  He found little more success with the bat, scoring just 26 runs in his five innings in the middle order, with a top score of 12 and an average of 5.20. He made no catches.

The first of his two appearances in 1873 was against Gloucestershire at Bramall Lane in Sheffield, in July. Yorkshire's decision to bat after winning the toss proved unwise as they were skittled out for 113, with Armitage at number six run out for 7. W.G. Grace scored 79 and Townsend 88 in the visitors' 282, despite Armitage's one and only spell of bowling in first-class cricket. He was bowled for a duck in Yorkshire's second effort of 247, and Gloucestershire completed their six-wicket victory in 32 overs, with two more Grace brothers making contributions with the bat.

Armitage's second match, against Nottinghamshire at St. John's Ground in Huddersfield, was a more satisfying affair. Although he made just 12 in Yorkshire's 194 and did not bowl, the visitors were dismissed for 104 and 66 to lose by an innings and 24 runs.

Despite this turn in fortunes, Yorkshire did not call on his services again until the Australian tourists came to Fartown in Huddersfield in May 1878. Yorkshire made a poor start, dismissed for just 72 by Spofforth (4 - 30) and Boyle (5 - 32). Batting at number six, Armitage scored two runs before being bowled by Boyle. Australia fared little better in reply, posting 113 with Emmet taking 5 for 23. An Armitage did bowl and take a wicket for Yorkshire, but it was his namesake Tom.  Yorkshire did one run better second time around: Spofforth took 5 for 31, while Armitage was dismissed caught Gregory bowled Midwinter for five, in his final first-class match.  The Australians lost four wickets to Emmett and Hill, but won in 40.2 overs, and the first-class career of Armitage was done.

Armitage died at High Royd House, Honley, Yorkshire, at the age of 67.

References

External links
Cricinfo Profile

1849 births
1917 deaths
Yorkshire cricketers
Cricketers from Huddersfield
English cricketers
English cricketers of 1864 to 1889